South Adelaide Panthers Football Club are a soccer club from the southern suburbs of Adelaide, South Australia. They play in the National Premier League NPL South Australia, with a home ground at the O'Sullivan Beach Sports Complex, also known as Panther Park. Panthers also field senior female teams in Division 2.

History
The club was founded in August 1997 to provide opportunities for the advancement to senior level for players associated with the South Adelaide Colts Club. The club was originally an attempt to use and dominate the south as Noarlunga United and Seaford had limited success despite good youth talent in the area. although they were initially successful many player disputes with management led to much of the youth talent obtained leaving before playing much first team football for the club. The Panthers F.C. as they are affectionately known are the hated rivals of Noarlunga United as a result of player movements, transfer politics and club proximity.

When the club was formed it was jointly owned by the Sporting Star and South Adelaide Colts. The club's initial games were played at the Cove Sports Community Centre – a ground known for its heavy winds.

The Panthers have fielded young teams in the SASF 2nd Division. After initially struggling the Panthers have steadily improved to become a regular mid-table side in the 2nd Division. The Panthers were then coached by Aldo Maricic.

In 2008 the club planned a tournament to mark the passing of Tony Macentagert a club president at the time which they named after him inviting local teams from the area. Included were Seaford Rangers F.C., Noarlunga United F.C. and Hallett Cove F.C.(amateur club).  South Adelaide beat Noarlunga on penalties in the inaugural tournament and hope to make it an annual event.

After gaining promotion to the South Australian National Premier League in 2013 for the first time in the club's history, the senior men's side became the first club from the south of the Adelaide region to compete in the top South Australian division.

The club is currently managed by Andrew Calderbank and plays in the 2020 State League One Competition.

Managerial history

Pink Panthers history

On 23 September 2012 Tegan Wilkinson played her 100th Senior Women's Game for the South Adelaide Pink Panthers, being the club's first female player to achieve this milestone. Tegan has played every year since the start in 2005. On 9 August 2015 Jess Kirk became the second female to play 100 Senior Women's Games for the Club, marking the occasion with a well-taken winning goal against previously undefeated Salisbury Inter.

Club honours

2017 State League 1 League Champions

Notable former players
Fabian Barbiero
Stephen Hoyle

Affiliated clubs 

 Cardijn Old Collegians Football Club

References

External links
 Official Website

National Premier Leagues clubs
Soccer clubs in Adelaide
Association football clubs established in 1997
1997 establishments in Australia